St Catherine's, Ventnor is a parish church in the Church of England located in Ventnor, Isle of Wight.

History

The church dates from 1837 and was designed by the architect Robert Ebbels, at a cost of £4,655 funded by John Hambrough of Steephill Castle.

The chancel was a later addition in 1849 and the south aisle in 1897.

Windsor Dudley Cecil Hambrough of Steephill was the victim in the Ardlamont House Murder and was buried in the churchyard in 1893.

Parish Status

The church is within a group which includes:
Old St Boniface Church, Bonchurch
St Boniface Church, Bonchurch
Holy Trinity Church, Ventnor
St Catherine's Church, Ventnor
Services every Sunday at 10:45
Cafe Church 1st Sunday of every month
The Hub Coffee shop open mornings Monday to Saturday

Organ

The church has a pipe organ by James Jepson Binns. A specification of the organ can be found on the National Pipe Organ Register.

List of musicians

Michele Brock, John Holder,  Roger Glover

References

Church of England church buildings on the Isle of Wight
Grade II listed churches on the Isle of Wight
Ventnor